Mateusz Łęgowski (born 29 January 2003) is a Polish professional footballer who plays as a midfielder for Pogoń Szczecin and the Poland national team.

References

External links
 
 

Living people
2003 births
Association football midfielders
Polish footballers
Poland international footballers
Poland youth international footballers
Poland under-21 international footballers
Pogoń Szczecin players
Valencia CF players
Ekstraklasa players
III liga players
Polish expatriate footballers
People from Brodnica County